Carl Friedrich Benz (25 November 1844 – 4 April 1929), was a German engine designer and automotive engineer.  His Benz Patent Motorcar from 1885 is considered the first practical modern automobile and first car put into series production.  He received a patent for the motorcar in 1886.

His company Benz & Cie., based in Mannheim, was the world's first automobile plant and largest of its day. In 1926, it merged with Daimler Motoren Gesellschaft to form Daimler-Benz, which produces the Mercedes-Benz among other brands.

Benz is widely regarded as "the father of the car", as well as the "father of the automobile industry".

Early life

Carl Benz was born Karl Friedrich Michael Vaillant, on 25 November 1844 in Mühlburg, now a borough of Karlsruhe, Baden-Württemberg, which is part of modern Germany. His parents were Josephine Vaillant and a locomotive driver, Johann Georg Benz, whom she married a few months later. According to German law, the child acquired the name "Benz" by legal marriage of his parents.  When he was two years old, his father died of pneumonia, and his name was changed to Karl Friedrich Benz in remembrance of his father.

Despite living in near poverty, his mother strove to give him a good education. Benz attended the local school in Karlsruhe and was a prodigious student. In 1853, at the age of nine, he started at the scientifically oriented Lyceum. Next he studied at Karlsruhe's polytechnical school under the instruction of Ferdinand Redtenbacher.

Benz had originally focused his studies on locksmithing, but he eventually followed his father's steps toward locomotive engineering. On 30 September 1860, at age 15, he passed the entrance exam for mechanical engineering for the Karlsruhe polytechnical school, which he subsequently attended. Benz graduated 9 July 1864 aged 19.

Following his formal education, Benz had seven years of professional training in several companies, but did not fit well in any of them. The training started in Karlsruhe with two years of varied jobs in a mechanical engineering company.

He then moved to Mannheim to work as a draftsman and designer in a scales factory. In 1868 he went to Pforzheim to work for the bridge building company Gebrüder Benckiser Eisenwerke und Maschinenfabrik. Finally, he went to Vienna for a short period to work at an iron construction company.

Benz's first factory and early inventions (1871–1882)
In 1871, at the age of twenty-seven, Karl Benz joined August Ritter in launching the Iron Foundry and Mechanical Workshop in Mannheim, later renamed Factory for Machines for Sheet-metal Working.

The enterprise's first year went very badly. Ritter turned out to be unreliable, and the business's tools were impounded. The difficulty was overcome when Benz's fiancée, Bertha Ringer, bought out Ritter's share in the company using her dowry.

On 20 July 1872, Karl Benz and Bertha Ringer married. They had five children: Eugen (1873), Richard (1874), Clara (1877), Thilde (1882), and Ellen (1890).

Despite the business misfortunes, Karl Benz led in the development of new engines in the early factory he and his wife owned. To get more revenue, in 1878 he began to work on new patents. First, he concentrated on creating a reliable petrol two-stroke engine. Benz finished his two-stroke engine on 31 December 1879, and was granted a patent for it on 28 June 1880.

Karl Benz showed his real genius, however, through his successive inventions registered while designing what would become the production standard for his two-stroke engine. Benz soon patented the speed regulation system, the ignition using sparks with battery, the spark plug, the carburetor, the clutch, the gear shift, and the water radiator.

Benz's Gasmotoren-Fabrik Mannheim (1882–1883)
Problems arose again when the banks at Mannheim demanded that Bertha and Karl Benz's enterprise be incorporated due to the high production costs it maintained. The Benzes were forced to improvise an association with photographer Emil Bühler and his brother (a cheese merchant), to get additional bank support. The company became the joint-stock company Gasmotoren Fabrik Mannheim in 1882.

After all the necessary incorporation agreements, Benz was unhappy because he was left with merely five percent of the shares and a modest position as director. Worst of all, his ideas weren't considered when designing new products, so he withdrew from that corporation just one year later, in 1883.

Benz and Cie. and the Benz Patent-Motorwagen

Benz's lifelong hobby brought him to a bicycle repair shop in Mannheim owned by Max Rose and Friedrich Wilhelm Eßlinger. In 1883, the three founded a new company producing industrial machines: Benz & Companie Rheinische Gasmotoren-Fabrik, usually referred to as Benz & Cie. Quickly growing to twenty-five employees, it soon began to produce static gas engines as well.

The success of the company gave Benz the opportunity to indulge in his old passion of designing a horseless carriage. Based on his experience with, and fondness for, bicycles, he used similar technology when he created an automobile. It featured wire wheels (unlike carriages' wooden ones) with a four-stroke engine of his own design between the rear wheels, with a very advanced coil ignition and evaporative cooling rather than a radiator. Power was transmitted by means of two roller chains to the rear axle. Karl Benz finished his creation in 1885 and named it "Benz Patent-Motorwagen".

The Motorwagen was patented on 29 January 1886 as DRP-37435: "automobile fueled by gas". The 1885 version was difficult to control, leading to a collision with a wall during a public demonstration. The first successful tests on public roads were carried out in the early summer of 1886. The next year Benz created the Motorwagen Model 2, which had several modifications, and in 1889, the definitive Model 3 with wooden wheels was introduced, showing at the Paris Expo the same year.

Benz began to sell the vehicle (advertising it as "Benz Patent-Motorwagen") in the late summer of 1888, making it the first commercially available automobile in history. The second customer of the Motorwagen was a Parisian bicycle manufacturer Emile Roger, who had already been building Benz engines under license from Karl Benz for several years. Roger added the Benz automobiles (many built in France) to the line he carried in Paris and initially most were sold there.

The early 1888 version of the Motorwagen had only two gears and could not climb hills unaided. This limitation was rectified after Bertha Benz made her famous trip driving one of the vehicles a great distance and suggested to her husband the addition of a third gear for climbing hills. In the course of this trip she also invented brake pads.

Bertha Benz's long-distance drive

The world's first ever long distance automobile trip was undertaken by Bertha Benz using a Model 3. On the morning of 5 August 1888 Bertha – supposedly without the knowledge of her husband – took the vehicle on a  trip from Mannheim to Pforzheim to visit her mother, taking her sons Eugen and Richard with her. In addition to having to locate pharmacies along the way to refuel, she repaired various technical and mechanical problems. One of these included the invention of brake lining; after some longer downhill slopes she ordered a shoemaker to nail leather onto the brake blocks. Bertha Benz and sons finally arrived at nightfall, announcing the achievement to Karl by telegram. It had been her intention to demonstrate the feasibility of using the Benz Motorwagen for travel and to generate publicity in the manner now referred to as live marketing. Today, the event is celebrated every two years in Germany with an antique automobile rally.

In 2008, the Bertha Benz Memorial Route was officially approved as a route of the industrial heritage of mankind, because it follows Bertha Benz's tracks of the world's first long-distance journey by automobile in 1888. The return trip – which didn't go through Heidelberg – was along a different, slightly shorter route, as shown on the maps of the Bertha Benz Memorial Route.

Benz's Model 3 made its wide-scale debut to the world in the 1889 World's Fair in Paris; about twenty-five Motorwagens were built between 1886 and 1893.

Benz and Cie. expansion

The great demand for static internal combustion engines forced Karl Benz to enlarge the factory in Mannheim, and in 1886 a new building located on Waldhofstrasse (operating until 1908) was added. Benz & Cie. had grown in the interim from 50 employees in 1889 to 430 in 1899.

During the last years of the nineteenth century, Benz was the largest automobile company in the world with 572 units produced in 1899.

Because of its size, in 1899, Benz & Cie. became a joint-stock company with the arrival of Friedrich von Fischer and Julius Ganß, who came aboard as members of the Board of Management. Ganß worked in the commercialization department, which is somewhat similar to marketing in contemporary corporations.

The new directors recommended that Benz should create a less expensive automobile suitable for mass production. The model was successful with 85 units sold in 1893, and was produced in a four-seated version with face-to-face seat benches called the "Vis-à-Vis".

From 1894 to 1902, Benz produced over 1,200 of what some consider the first mass-produced car, the Velocipede, later known as the Benz Velo.

In 1895, Benz designed the first truck with an internal combustion engine in history. Benz also built the first motor buses in history in 1895, for the Netphener bus company.

In 1896, Karl Benz was granted a patent for his design of the first flat engine. It had horizontally opposed pistons, a design in which the corresponding pistons reach top dead centre simultaneously, thus balancing each other with respect to momentum. Many flat engines, particularly those with four or fewer cylinders, are arranged as "boxer engines", boxermotor in German, and also are known as "horizontally opposed engines". This design is still used by Porsche, Subaru, and some high performance engines used in racing cars. In motorcycles, the most famous boxer engine is found in BMW Motorrad, though the boxer engine design was used in many other models, including Victoria, Harley-Davidson XA, Zündapp, Wooler, Douglas Dragonfly, Ratier, Universal, IMZ-Ural, Dnepr, Gnome et Rhône, Chang Jiang, Marusho, and the Honda Gold Wing.

Although Gottlieb Daimler died in March 1900—and there is no evidence that Benz and Daimler knew each other nor that they knew about each other's early achievements—eventually, competition with Daimler Motoren Gesellschaft (DMG) in Stuttgart began to challenge the leadership of Benz & Cie. In October 1900, the main designer of DMG, Wilhelm Maybach, built the engine that would later be used in the Mercedes-35hp of 1902. The engine was built to the specifications of Emil Jellinek under a contract for him to purchase thirty-six vehicles with the engine, and for him to become a dealer of the special series. Jellinek stipulated the new engine be named Daimler-Mercedes (for his daughter). Maybach would quit DMG in 1907, but he designed the model and all of the important changes. After testing, the first was delivered to Jellinek on 22 December 1900. Jellinek continued to make suggestions for changes to the model and obtained good results racing the automobile in the next few years, encouraging DMG to engage in commercial production of automobiles, which they did in 1902.

Then, without consulting Benz, the other directors hired some French designers.

France was a country with an extensive automobile industry based on Maybach's creations. Because of this action, after difficult discussions, Karl Benz announced his retirement from design management on 24 January 1903, although he remained as director on the Board of Management through its merger with DMG in 1926 and, remained on the board of the new Daimler-Benz corporation until his death in 1929.

He was inducted into the Automotive Hall of Fame in 1984 and the European Automotive Hall of Fame.

Benz's sons Eugen and Richard left Benz & Cie. in 1903, but Richard returned to the company in 1904 as the designer of passenger vehicles.

That year, sales of Benz & Cie. reached 3,480 automobiles, and the company remained the leading manufacturer of automobiles.

Along with continuing as a director of Benz & Cie., Karl Benz would soon found another company, C. Benz Söhne, (with his son Eugen and closely held within the family), a privately held company for manufacturing automobiles. The brand name used the first initial of the French variant of Benz's first name, "Carl".

Blitzen Benz

In 1909, the Blitzen Benz was built in Mannheim by Benz & Cie. It was transported to several countries, including the United States, to establish multiple records of this achievement.

Benz Söhne (1906–1923)

The latter type was replaced by petrol engines because of lack of demand.

This company never issued stocks publicly, building its own line of automobiles independently from Benz & Cie., which was located in Mannheim. The Benz Sons automobiles were of good quality and became popular in London as taxis.

In 1912, Karl Benz liquidated all of his shares in Benz Sons and left the family-held company in Ladenburg to Eugen and Richard, but he remained as a director of Benz & Cie.

During a birthday celebration for him in his home town of Karlsruhe on 25 November 1914, the seventy-year-old Karl Benz was awarded an honorary doctorate by his alma mater, the Karlsruhe University, thereby becoming—Dr. Ing. h. c. Karl Benz.

Almost from the very beginning of the production of automobiles, participation in sports car racing became a major method to gain publicity for manufacturers. At first, the production models were raced and the Benz Velo participated in the first automobile race: Paris to Rouen 1894. Later, investment in developing racecars for motorsports produced returns through sales generated by the association of the name of the automobile with the winners. Unique race vehicles were built at the time such as the first mid-engine and aerodynamically designed, Tropfenwagen, a "teardrop" body introduced at the 1923 European Grand Prix at Monza.

In the last production year of the Benz Sons company, 1923, three hundred and fifty units were built. During the following year, 1924, Karl Benz built two additional 8/25 hp units of the automobile manufactured by this company, tailored for his personal use, which he never sold; they are still preserved.

Toward Daimler-Benz and the first Mercedes-Benz in 1926

The German economic crisis worsened. In 1923 Benz & Cie. produced only 1,382 units in Mannheim, and DMG made only 1,020 in Stuttgart. The average cost of an automobile was 25 million marks because of rapid inflation. Negotiations between the two companies resumed and in 1924 they signed an "Agreement of Mutual Interest" valid until the year 2000. Both enterprises standardized design, production, purchasing, sales, and advertising—marketing their automobile models jointly—although keeping their respective brands.

On 28 June 1926, Benz & Cie. and DMG finally merged as the Daimler-Benz company, baptizing all of its automobiles, Mercedes-Benz, honoring the most important model of the DMG automobiles, the 1902 Mercedes 35 hp, along with the Benz name. The name of that DMG model had been selected after ten-year-old Mercédès Jellinek, the daughter of Emil Jellinek who had set the specifications for the new model. Between 1900 and 1909 he was a member of DMG's board of management, however had resigned long before the merger.

Karl Benz was a member of the new Daimler-Benz board of management for the remainder of his life. A new logo was created in 1926, consisting of a three pointed star (representing Daimler's motto: "engines for land, air, and water") surrounded by traditional laurels from the Benz logo, and the brand of all of its automobiles was labeled Mercedes-Benz. Model names would follow the brand name in the same convention as today.

The next year, 1927, the number of units sold tripled to 7,918 and the diesel line was launched for truck production. In 1928, the Mercedes-Benz SSK was presented.

On 4 April 1929, Karl Benz died at his home in Ladenburg at the age of 84 from a bronchial inflammation. Until her death on 5 May 1944, Bertha Benz continued to reside in their last home. Members of the family resided in the home for thirty more years. The Benz home now has been designated as historic and is used as a scientific meeting facility for a nonprofit foundation, the Gottlieb Daimler and Karl Benz Foundation, that honors both Bertha and Karl Benz for their roles in the history of automobiles.

Legacy

The Carl-Benz-Gymnasium Ladenburg in Ladenburg, where he lived until his death, is named in his honor, as is the Automuseum Dr. Carl Benz, also located in Ladenburg.

In popular culture
In 2011, a dramatized television movie about the life of Karl and Bertha Benz was made named  which premiered on 11 May and was aired by Das Erste on 23 May. A trailer of the movie and a "making of" special were released on YouTube. Benz was also featured in the first episode of the History Television miniseries 'The Cars That Made The World.'

See also
Benz (unit)
German inventors and discoverers
History of the internal combustion engine
Siegfried Marcus

Notes

References
 (autobiography)
The life of a German inventor: my memories / Karl Benz
 (first edition) (bibrec)
The life of a German inventor; memories of an octogenarian
Elis, Angela: Mein Traum ist länger als die Nacht. Wie Bertha Benz ihren Mann zu Weltruhm fuhr. Hoffmann und Campe, Hamburg 2010, 
My dream is longer than the night. How Bertha Benz drove her husband to worldwide fame
 
 
Mercedes-Benz AG (Hrsg.), Benz & Cie.: Zum 150. Geburtstag von Karl Benz, Motorbuch Verlag: Stuttgart, 1994 1. Aufl. 296 S., 492 Abb., 124 in Farbe,  (biography)
Benz & Cie.: On the Occasion of the 150th Birthday of Karl Benz
 
Two men – one star: Gottlieb Daimler and Karl Benz in pictures, data and documents.
 (biography) Image of cover.  
Carl Benz: a Baden history; the vision of the "horseless car" changes the world
 
Karl Benz : A pioneer of motorization
 
Karl Benz : History of Technology

External links

 Brief biographies of Karl Benz and Bertha Benz, with portraits, an extensive archive, and detailed histories presented at the Mercedes-Benz Museum.
 Mercedes-Benz corporate archives , company archives , history , media management archives , and publications 
 copies of the honorary doctorate and Baden State medal in gold, both awarded to Karl Benz in his lifetime.
 Das Automuseum Dr. Carl Benz in der alten Benz Fabrik  is the Dr. Carl Benz Auto Museum created by a private group in 1996  in a former Benz factory for an ancillary business founded with his sons in Ladenburg, which was separate from his major companies.  The company opened in 1906 and closed in 1923, the site has a description of this museum and contemporary photographs  with "C. Benz SÖHNE KG" painted on the building, which contains historical photographs, some restored automobiles, and a chronology of the life of Karl Benz.
 Karl Benz on 3-wheelers.com 
 Bertha Benz Memorial Route
 Prof. John H. Lienhard on BERTHA Benz's RIDE
 The Karl Benz family grave site in Ladenburg The urn contains the ashes of their son, Richard Benz, and the inscription on the gravestone reads: 
 The Gottlieb Daimler and Karl Benz Foundation founded in 1986 at the last residence of Bertha and Karl Benz in Ladenburg.
 .
 video of a Benz Victoria being driven on the street in Germany

 
1844 births
1929 deaths
19th-century German inventors
German founders of automobile manufacturers
German industrialists
German mechanical engineers
People associated with the internal combustion engine
Engineers from Karlsruhe
People from the Grand Duchy of Baden
Karlsruhe Institute of Technology alumni
Businesspeople from Karlsruhe